Oodgeroo is an electoral district of the Legislative Assembly in the Australian state of Queensland. It was created in the 2017 redistribution, and was won at that year's election by Mark Robinson. It was named after Indigenous activist and poet Oodgeroo Noonuccal.

It largely replaces the abolished district of Cleveland. Located in City of Redland south-east of Brisbane, Oodgeroo consists of the suburbs of Birkdale, Wellington Point, Ormiston and Cleveland. It also covers the area of North Stradbroke Island.

From results of the 2015 election, Oodgeroo was estimated to be a marginal seat for the Liberal National Party with a margin of 5.7%.

Members for Oodgeroo

Election results

See also
 Electoral districts of Queensland
 Members of the Queensland Legislative Assembly by year
 :Category:Members of the Queensland Legislative Assembly by name

References

Electoral districts of Queensland